Youssoupha Birima Fall (born January 12, 1995) is a Senegalese-French professional basketball player. He is currently playing for ASVEL Basket of the French LNB Pro A and the EuroLeague.

Career 
Fall attended the Seeds Academy in Thiès, Senegal, before joining the youth ranks of French team Le Mans Sarthe Basket in 2012. He made his debut on Le Mans’ men's team during the 2014–15 season. In 2015, he was named to the "Cinq All Star Espoirs", the all-first team of the French development league, after averaging 12.6 points, 12.0 rebounds and 2.1 blocks per contest during the 2014-15 campaign.

An early entry candidate for the 2016 NBA draft, he later withdrew his name from the list. He was sent on loan to LNB Pro B side Poitiers Baskets 86 for the 2016–17 season.

On July 17, 2018, he signed a four-year deal with Kirolbet Baskonia of the Spanish Liga ACB and the EuroLeague. On August 9, 2018, Baskonia loaned him to SIG Strasbourg for the 2018–19 season. On August 15, 2021, Fall officially parted ways with the Basque club. He signed with ASVEL Basket on loan one day later.

National team 
Fall was invited to play both for Senegal and for France, but has not been active in national team competition thus far. In September 2022, he expressed his will to represent Senegal's national team.

Personal life 
Fall was granted French citizenship in March 2017.

References

External links 
 Profile at eurobasket.com

1995 births
Living people
ASVEL Basket players
Basketball players from Dakar
Centers (basketball)
French men's basketball players
Le Mans Sarthe Basket players
Liga ACB players
Poitiers Basket 86 players
Saski Baskonia players
Senegalese emigrants to France
Senegalese expatriate basketball people in France
Senegalese expatriate basketball people in Spain
Senegalese men's basketball players
SIG Basket players